The gross world product (GWP) is the combined gross national income of all the countries in the world. Because imports and exports balance exactly when considering the whole world, this also equals the total global gross domestic product (GDP). According to the World Bank, the 2013 nominal GWP was approximately 75.59 trillion United States dollars. In 2017, according to the CIA's World Factbook, the GWP was around $80.27 trillion in nominal terms and totaled approximately 127.8 trillion international dollars in terms of purchasing power parity (PPP). The per capita PPP GWP in 2017 was approximately 17,500 international dollars according to the World Factbook. According to the World Bank, the 2020 GWP in current dollars was approximately $84.705 trillion.

Recent growth
The table below gives recent percentage values for overall GWP growth from 2006 through 2020, as well as an estimate for 2021, according to the International Monetary Fund (IMF)'s World Economic Outlook database. Data is given in terms of constant year-on-year prices.

Historical and prehistorical estimates
In 1998, economic historian J. Bradford DeLong estimated the total GWP in 1990 U.S. dollars for the main years between one million years BCE and 2000 CE (shown in the table below). 

Nominal GWP estimates from 2005 onwards are also shown in contemporary U.S. dollars, according to estimates from the CIA World Factbook and the World Bank. "Billion" in the table below refers to the short scale usage of the term, where 1 billion = 1,000 million = 109.

See also
List of countries by GDP (nominal)
List of countries by GDP (PPP)
List of countries by real GDP growth rate
World economy
World population

Notes

References

External links
CIA data on GWP in The World Factbook
IMF database – contains continuously updated World Economic Outlook tables and reports

Global economic indicators
Gross domestic product